Tonis may refer to:

 Tõnis, Estonian given name
 Tonis (Canada), TV channel
 Tonis (Ukraine), TV channel
 Mike Tonis (born 1979), American baseball catcher

See also

 Toni (disambiguation)
Tonnis